Bjørn Kristensen is the name of:

Bjørn Kristensen (footballer, born 1963), Danish footballer
Bjørn Kristensen (footballer, born 1993), Maltese footballer